Bruce Edward Daniels Jr. (born October 24, 1989) is a former professional American football quarterback. He was drafted by the San Francisco 49ers in the seventh round of the 2013 NFL Draft after playing college football at South Florida. He played quarterback for South Florida and the Seattle Seahawks, before moving to wide receiver in 2015. He won Super Bowl XLVIII with the Seahawks over the Denver Broncos. He is now an offensive analyst at  the University of South Florida.

College career
Born and raised in Tallahassee, Florida, Daniels graduated from Lincoln High School in Tallahassee, where he once threw 6 touchdowns and 723 yards in a game vs Demply Prep. Daniels finished the 2009 season with 1983 yards passing, 772 yards rushing, and 23 total touchdowns. Daniels responded in his junior year with 3,205 total yards.  Daniels was on his way to becoming the all time yardage leader in Big East history when his senior season was cut short due to injury. Daniels ended his college career with 8,433 yards passing for 52 TD's, and 2,068 yards rushing for another 25 scores. Daniels achieved 10,501 total yards and 77 total touchdowns at USF, and finished his career second on the all time Big East yardage leaders. Daniels finished his college career high on all of USF's rushing and passing leaderboards. Daniels is also a member of Kappa Alpha Psi fraternity.

Statistics

Source:

Professional career

San Francisco 49ers
Daniels was drafted by the San Francisco 49ers in the seventh round with the 237th overall pick in the 2013 NFL Draft.

Seattle Seahawks
Daniels was claimed off waivers on October 2, 2013, by the Seattle Seahawks.
Daniels was waived by the Seahawks on November 16, 2013.
Daniels cleared waivers and the Seahawks signed him to the practice squad on November 18, 2013. On June 2, 2015, Seahawks offensive coordinator Darrell Bevell announced that Daniels would be making the switch to wide receiver for the 2015 season. Daniels was waived by the Seahawks on October 13, 2015. The team re-signed him two days later. On October 27, 2015, the Seahawks waived Daniels, but he re-signed with the team's practice squad soon after. On November 24, 2015, he was promoted to the active roster. On December 15, 2015, Daniels was waived.

Houston Texans
On December 21, 2015, Daniels was signed off the Seattle Seahawks' practice squad by the Houston Texans. On December 27, 2015, Daniels made his Texans debut against the Tennessee Titans, passing 1–2 for 7 yards and rushing for 6 yards.

New York Giants
On May 9, 2016, Daniels signed a contract with the New York Giants. On June 17, 2016, he was released by the Giants.

Chicago Bears
On July 27, 2016, Daniels signed a contract with the Chicago Bears. On September 3, 2016, he was released by the Bears as part of final roster cuts.

Atlanta Falcons
On December 19, 2016, Daniels was signed to the Atlanta Falcons' practice squad. He signed a reserve/future contract with the Falcons on February 7, 2017. In June 2017, it was reported that Daniels had converted to running back. He was released by the team on August 15, 2017.

Saskatchewan Roughriders
On May 17, 2018, Daniels signed with the Saskatchewan Roughriders of the Canadian Football League.  He was cut June 9, 2018.

Salt Lake Stallions
In 2018, Daniels was assigned to the Orlando Apollos of the Alliance of American Football. On November 27, he was drafted by the Salt Lake Stallions in the second round of the 2019 AAF QB Draft. He did not make the team's final 52-man roster, but was instead placed on injured reserve. The league ceased operations in April 2019.

Seattle Dragons
In 2019, Daniels was a member of the 2020 XFL Draft class, and was selected by the Seattle Dragons during the open phase. He made his XFL debut in place of an injured Brandon Silvers and threw one incomplete pass. On February, 29, 2020, Daniels came in for relief after Brandon Silvers was unable to be successful in the first half and helped his team score their first touchdown of the game, on a run by Kenneth Farrow, and then scored his first points as an XFL player, on a 1-Pt conversion. He had his contract terminated when the league suspended operations on April 10, 2020.

Statistics

Source:

Coaching career

High school coaching 
Daniels was hired as the quarterbacks coach at Leon High School in 2018. He was named the head coach at his alma mater Lincoln High School in Tallahassee in 2020.

South Florida 
Daniels was hired as an offensive analyst at his alma mater South Florida in 2021.

References

External links
Seattle Seahawks bio
USF Bulls bio

1989 births
Living people
Players of American football from Tallahassee, Florida
African-American players of American football
American football quarterbacks
American football wide receivers
Canadian football quarterbacks
American players of Canadian football
South Florida Bulls football players
San Francisco 49ers players
Seattle Seahawks players
Houston Texans players
New York Giants players
Chicago Bears players
Atlanta Falcons players
Saskatchewan Roughriders players
American football running backs
Salt Lake Stallions players
Seattle Dragons players
High school football coaches in Florida
South Florida Bulls football coaches
21st-century African-American sportspeople
20th-century African-American people